Bard Gola (also Romanized as Bard Golā) is a village in Seyyedvaliyeddin Rural District, Sardasht District, Dezful County, Khuzestan Province, Iran. At the 2006 census, its population was 70, in 10 families.

References 

Populated places in Dezful County